The British Embassy Kyiv (also known as Kiev), is the British sovereign's diplomatic mission to Ukraine, representing the United Kingdom and the United Kingdom's interests.  The embassy is located on Desyatynna street in the Pecherskyi District of the city, right opposite to the building of the Ministry of Foreign Affairs of Ukraine. The British Ambassador to Ukraine is Melinda Simmons who was appointed in 2019.

History 
The United Kingdom recognised the independence of Ukraine on 31 December 1991.  Diplomatic relations were established on 10 January 1992. The United Kingdom opened a consulate-general in Kyiv in November 1991. This became an embassy in January 1992.

The United Kingdom withdrew around half of all staff in the days following 24 January 2022 amid fears of a Russian invasion, according to a statement from the Foreign Office. This followed a similar slow withdrawal of Russian embassy staff and relatives of U.S. embassy staff leaving Ukraine. On 20 April 2022, it was announced that the British Embassy in Kyiv would be reopening the following week. During 2022, 350 Royal Marines from 45 Commando supported embassy diplomats in Ukraine.

See also
 Ukraine–United Kingdom relations 
 List of Ambassadors from the United Kingdom to Ukraine
 List of diplomatic missions in Ukraine

References

External links 
 Embassy of the United Kingdom, Kyiv official website 

Ukraine–United Kingdom relations
United Kingdom
Kyiv